Barry J. Klarberg (born March 4, 1961), CPA, is an American businessman. He is a professional business and wealth manager for athletes, entertainers and high-net-worth individuals. He is the founder and CEO of Monarch Business and Wealth Management, a full-service firm and family office that specializes in providing business and wealth management services. 

In January 2022, Klarberg sold Monarch Business & Wealth Management, a financial planning firm for high net-worth individuals, to MAI Capital Management and Galway Holdings, a company with $12.2B assets under management. Klarberg will become Senior Managing Director at MAI Capital Management.

Klarberg has managed several prominent individuals including musician/actor Justin Timberlake, artist Alec Monopoly, entrepreneur Russell Simmons, DJ and record producer Kaskade, NASCAR champion Kyle Busch, professional tennis player/model Anna Kournikova, NBA All-Star Kyle Lowry, MLB All-Star and Homerun Champion José Bautista, NBA analyst and entrepreneur Jay Williams, MLS All-Star and Captain of the United States men's national soccer team Michael Bradley, and NHL Hall-of-Famer Mark Messier.

Klarberg holds an ownership stake in three American professional sports franchises.  He is an owner of the New York Yankees, being a Partner since 2011. Klarberg is an owner of Major League Soccer (MLS) team New York City FC. 

Since 2017, Klarberg taught "Business Developments in Sports" at the University of Michigan in Ann Arbor. 

He regularly appears on CNN, CNBC and The Wall Street Journal Report, and authored the book "Winning Tax Strategies and Planning for Athletes and Entertainers." Klarberg has also been elected to the Sports Business Journal's "Forty Under 40," as he was selected as one of the forty most influential executives in the sports business under the age of 40.

In April 2016, Klarberg represented NFL star Rob Gronkowski and launched with Monster Energy a signature beverage "Gronk" that will be distributed by Coca-Cola.

In May 2016, Klarberg shaped Tom Brady’s new Simmons Beautyrest Black luxury mattress ad campaign, aiding Simmons’ marketing team in pitching the campaign to the three-time Super Bowl MVP.

In April 2021, Klarberg represented Bethenny Frankel in signing a multi-year deal with iHeartRadio to bring the podcast “Just B with Bethenny Frankel” to the iHeartPodcast Network.

Klarberg was commissioned the honorary title Kentucky Colonel, the highest honor awarded by the Commonwealth of Kentucky, by Kentucky Governor Steven Beshear.

In 2015, Klarberg gave the commencement address at alma mater Pace University to the undergraduate Class of 2015 and received an honorary doctorate degree. Klarberg also returned to Pace University as an Executive-in-Residence and a Lecturer-in-Residence at the Lubin School of Business. Klarberg is a member of the President's Council at Pace University.

Education and early career
Klarberg received his BBA (1981) and MS in Taxation (1985) from Pace University. He was an Adjunct Professor of Taxation at Pace University from 1985–1989. Klarberg began his career at Deloitte in 1981, where he spent 11 years. At Deloitte, he was the National Director of Sports and Entertainment. In 1992, Klarberg formed KRT Business Management, specializing in professional wealth management services, which he eventually sold to Assante Wealth Management Services.

Preceding Monarch, Klarberg spent two years as Senior Managing Director at Guggenheim Partners. In this role, Klarberg headed up Guggenheim Wealth Services' New York office.

Monarch Business & Wealth Management
Klarberg is the founder of Monarch Business & Wealth Management, a financial and life management company and family office that represents professional athletes, internationally acclaimed entertainers and high-net-worth families.  He currently manages artist Alec Monopoly, entrepreneur Russell Simmons, DJ and record producer Kaskade, several top NASCAR drivers, Anna Kournikova, MLB All-Star C. J. Wilson, MLB All-Star and Homerun Champion José Bautista and NHL Hall-of-Famer Mark Messier, amongst others. In 2011, Asset Alliance Corporation, a New York-based private equity firm with more than $1 billion under management, acquired an equity interest in Monarch Business & Wealth Management.

In 2012, the Sports Business Journal reported on Klarberg's expansion of Monarch Management.  The report of this expansion included Klarberg's proposed acquisition of Miami-based ASF Consulting, a firm owned by Allen Furst that represents several current and former MLB and NBA players, including Roy Hibbert, Jeff Green and Alonzo Mourning. Klarberg further expanded Monarch when he hired former Major League Baseball starting pitcher and United States Olympian Kris Benson as Managing Director at Monarch Business & Wealth Management.

In 2013, CertusBank, a nationally chartered bank with nearly $2 billion in assets, made a strategic investment in Monarch.

In April 2016, Klarberg represented NFL star Rob Gronkowski and launched with Monster Energy a signature beverage "Gronk" that will be distributed by Coca-Cola.

In 2016, Josh Klein became a partner in Monarch, whose clients include The Chainsmokers, Big Sean, Logic, DJ Snake and Kelly Rowland.

In January 2022, Klarberg sold Monarch Business & Wealth Management, a financial planning firm for high net-worth individuals, to MAI Capital Management, a company with $12.2B assets under management. Klarberg will become Senior Managing Director at MAI Capital Management.

New York Yankees and Yankees Global Enterprises
In September 2011, Klarberg became a Limited Partner of the New York Yankees.  Teaming up with former Glencore oil commodities trader Ray Bartoszek, the two currently hold an ownership interest in Yankee Global Enterprises including a stake in the Yankees Entertainment & Sports Network (YES Network). In 2013, Klarberg also became an owner of Major League Soccer team New York City FC.

Personal life
Klarberg is a resident of Greenwich, Connecticut. He is currently married to charity consultant Sara Herbert-Galloway.

Community involvement

Klarberg is actively involved in various charity and community activities including the National Meningitis Association, the USO, and Homeland Security's Federal Enforcement Foundation. In 2011, Klarberg was selected as an Executive Committee Member of the USO Entertainment Advisory Council, which helps brings professional athletes and entertainers overseas to visit American soldiers.

In April 2012, Klarberg, along with Sara Herbert, was honored with the National Meningitis Association Nancy Ford Springer Inspiration Award for his long-standing support of NMA’s fight against the vaccine-preventable disease.

In 2012, Klarberg was selected as a member of the 2014 NY/NJ Super Bowl XLVIII Host Committee.

Klarberg and sons Matt and Ryan Klarberg were commissioned the honorary title Kentucky Colonel, the highest honor awarded by the Commonwealth of Kentucky, in 2012 by Kentucky Governor Steven Beshear, in recognition of their noteworthy accomplishments and outstanding service to the greater community.

In 2015, Klarberg gave the commencement address at alma mater Pace University to the undergraduate Class of 2015 and received an honorary doctorate degree. Klarberg also returned to Pace University as an Executive-in-Residence and a Lecturer-in-Residence at the Lubin School of Business.  Klarberg is a member of the President's Council at Pace University.

Since 2017, Klarberg taught "Business Developments in Sports" in the Sport Management Program at the University of Michigan in Ann Arbor.

References

1961 births
Living people
American accountants
American chief executives of financial services companies
American money managers
American music managers
Businesspeople from Greenwich, Connecticut
Memphis Grizzlies owners
New York Yankees owners
Ross School of Business faculty

University of Michigan faculty and staff